Tony Donlic (born March 24, 1956) is a former American soccer forward who spent five season in the North American Soccer League (NASL).  He also earned seven caps with the U.S. national team in 1977.

Club career
Tony Donlic, a native of Yugoslavia, joined the New York Cosmos of the NASL in 1975.  However, he did not see time with the first team until 1978.  In 1979, he moved to the San Diego Sockers for a single season before leaving the NASL. After retiring from professional soccer he joined the amateur club NY Croatia of the Cosmopolitan Soccer League where he was instrumental in turning the team into a regional powerhouse.

National team
In 1977, Donlic played seven games with the U.S. national team as a forward and midfielder.  His first appearance came on September 15, 1977 in a 2-1 win over El Salvador in San Salvador.  Over the next month, he played six more games, his last coming in a 2-1 win over China on October 16, 1977.

He owned a bar in Budapest for several years, but currently lives in Croatia near Split.

References

External links
 NASL Stats

1956 births
Living people
Sportspeople from Vinkovci 
Yugoslav footballers
American soccer players
North American Soccer League (1968–1984) players
New York Cosmos players
San Diego Sockers (NASL) players
Yugoslav emigrants to the United States
United States men's international soccer players
Association football forwards